Amandeep Singh may refer to:

 Amandeep Singh (cricketer) (born 1987), New Zealand cricketer
 Amandeep Singh (footballer) (born 1988), Indian footballer